Caripe is one of the 13 municipalities of the state of Monagas, Venezuela. The municipality's capital is Caripe, and the Cueva del Guácharo National Park is its main tourist attraction. In the north it borders the state of Sucre, to the east is the municipality of Piar, to the south are the municipalities of Bolivar and Punceres and to the west is the municipality of Acosta.

Culture

Public holidays 
Carnivals: In February or March.

Cuisine 
The dishes typical in Caripe are arepa and hot chocolate. The people drink rum of petals of roses.

Politics and government

Mayors 
Luis Alirio Amundaray. (2004 - 2008, 2008 - 2013) PSUV.
Ángel Rodríguez. (2013 - 2017) PSUV.
 Orangel Salazar. (2017 – 2021)
 Dalila Rosillo. (2021 – present)

References

Municipalities of Monagas